HPS may refer to:

Education 
 Halepaghen Grammar School, in Buxtehude, Germany
 Hamtramck Public Schools, in Michigan, United States
 Hastings Public Schools (Nebraska), in the United States
Highline Public Schools, in Washington, United States
 History and philosophy of science
 Hyderabad Public School, in India
 Habib Public School, in Pakistan

Health and medicine 
 Hantavirus pulmonary syndrome. transmitted by rodents
 Harris platelet syndrome
 Health Physics Society
 Health Protection Scotland
 Heart Protection Study, a British clinical trial
 Hermansky–Pudlak syndrome

Technology 
 Handley Page HPS, a prototype aircraft
 High-pressure sodium, a type of lamp
 Hindawi Programming System
 HPS stain, a tissue stain
 Hydraulic power steering, a power steering system in automobiles
 Ilford HPS, a type of photographic film

Other uses 
 3-hexulose-6-phosphate synthase
 Croatian Mountaineering Association
 Croatian Popular Party
 Hawai'i Sign Language
 Heartland Payment Systems, an American payment processing company
 Helsingin Palloseura, a Finnish sport club
 Humanist Party of Switzerland
 Hundred Peaks Section, an American mountaineering society
 Protection Force of Sinjar